is a railway station on the Takayama Main Line in city of Toyama, Japan, operated by West Japan Railway Company (JR West).

Lines

Layout
The station has one island platform serving two tracks, connected to the station building by a footbridge. The station is unattended.

Platforms

Adjacent stations

History
The station opened on 1 October 1929. With the privatization of Japanese National Railways (JNR) on 1 April 1987, the station came under the control of JR West.

Passenger statistics
In fiscal 2015, the station was used by an average of 136 passengers daily (boarding passengers only).

Surrounding area
Japan National Route 41

See also
 List of railway stations in Japan

References

External links

 

Railway stations in Toyama Prefecture
Stations of West Japan Railway Company
Railway stations in Japan opened in 1929
Takayama Main Line
Toyama (city)